The Katsurazawa Dam is a dam in Hokkaidō, Japan.  It was Hokkaido's first multipurpose dam and the post-war Ishikari River watershed development plan's starting point.  The dam is a 63.6m in height Concrete Gravity dam, immediately downstream from the Shinkatsurazawa Dam. The artificial lake resulting from the construction of the Katsurazawa Dam is known as the Katsurazawa Lake.

Overview 
The construction of the dam would lead to the relocation of 172 households.  The dam's goals were to supply water for irrigation to Bibai Fields, Bibai City, Mikasa City, and also to produce up to 15,000 kW of Hydro Electric Power.

References

Dams in Hokkaido
Dams completed in 1957